In The Realm of the Hackers is a 2003 Australian documentary directed by Kevin Anderson about the prominent hacker community, centered in Melbourne, Australia in the late 1980s until early 1990. The storyline is centered on the Australian teenagers going by the hacker names "Electron" and "Phoenix", who were members of an elite computer hacking group called 'The Realm' and hacked into some of the most secure computer networks in the world, including those of the US Naval Research Laboratory, Lawrence Livermore National Laboratory, a government lab charged with the security of the US nuclear stockpile, and NASA. The film runs for 55 minutes and was inspired by the book Underground, by Melbourne-based writer and academic Suelette Dreyfus.

See also
Electron (computer hacker)
Nahshon Even-Chaim
Underground: Tales of Hacking, Madness and Obsession on the Electronic Frontier
Hacktivism

References

External links

Broadcast write-up
Australian Film Commission information

2003 films
2003 short documentary films
Australian short documentary films
Documentary films about the Internet
Hacker culture
Works about computer hacking
2000s English-language films